Region B may refer to:

 Region B of the IALA Maritime Buoyage System
 Region B of the Blu-ray disc storage system